
This is the list of ships built at Hietalahti shipyard in Helsinki, Finland, from the beginning until yard number 200. The list is incomplete due to missing archives from the early years (1865–1884).

See also 
 List of ships built at Hietalahti shipyard (201–400)
 List of ships built at Hietalahti shipyard (401 onwards)

Notes

References

Bibliography 

Hietalahti 1